Chloe Cook (born 1994) is a British professional triathlete.

Career

Cook competes at sprint, standard and Ironman 70.3 distances. Her highest placed results to date in the ITU came at the 2015 Burgas and 2017 Tartu ETU Sprint Triathlon European Cups, finishing second in both races.

In 2019 she competed at the 70.3 Ironman Staffordshire, placing 4th female behind Lucy Charles-Barclay, Emma Pallant and Katrina Matthews (nee Rye) with a time of 4:30:20. She came out of the water in second place, maintained this position off the bike through T2 but then lost ground to Pallant and Matthews, with Pallant recording the fastest run split to take second place.

Personal life

Cook's parents are Sarah Coope and Glenn Cook, both former professional triathletes. Cook has three younger sisters, Ysabel, grace and Beth. her youngest sister, Beth, has had a number of successes in triathlon as a junior.

References 

1994 births
Living people
English female triathletes
Duathletes
Sportspeople from Eastbourne